Mattani is a village on Kohat Road in Khyber Pakhtunkhwa, Pakistan. Mattani is connected with Torkham Border via Frontier Road. The development of Kohat Road and Peshawar Bypass (Frontier Road) has brought economical revolution in Mattani region and also connects the entire Union Council of Tehsil Mattani with Mattani Town.

Overview 
Mattani has an important geo-physical, social and economical position among the towns around Kohat. The tribal areas of Darra Adam Khel and Khyber Agency are situated around Mattani.

Due to this geographical importance Mattani is considered to be the centre for all the social, economical and commercial activities of this area and it is the shopping hub for frontier regions like Sherkera, Adezai, Darra Adam Khel, Kala Khel, Passani, and Aka Khel.

Location 
Mattani serves as an important road link between Peshawar city and the remote tribal areas: Maryamzai to the north, Sherkera to the south and Bora and Darra Adam Khel to the west. It is also a major link between Peshawar and Kohat.

Mattani Bazar is the main shopping hub of nearby areas, comprising medical stores, vegetable markets, general stores, electronic shops, bakeries and sweet shops, garment shops and automobile repairing centres. It has one Civil Hospital, a 132 KV Grid station and a police station. Before 1996, the Indus Highway passed through Mattani Bazar.

Administration and Census Information 
Union Council Mattani 54 is located in ex Town 4 of Peshawar (declared Tehsil of Peshawar district on 2 September 2019), 30 km away from Peshawar. Mattani has 6 village councils:

 Toker Khel/Bala Toker Khel 
 Gulshan Abad 
 Chojo Khel
 Sunger Khel,
 Sra Khawra, 
 Darwazgai 
 Jani Ghari 

According to the 2017 census, the local population was reported to be 49,000, with registered voters numbering 17,992 as per the 2017 bye election voter list.

Mattani has a Govt Degree College, Govt High School for Boys, Govt Middle School for Boys, Govt Middle School for Girls, and four High Schools in a private setup.

See also 
 Peshawar
 Peshawar District
 Badaber

References

Populated places in Peshawar District